Alexander Skinner (August 14, 1856 – March 5, 1901) was a former Major League Baseball player. Skinner's handedness and physical dimensions are currently unknown. He appeared as an outfielder in two games in the Union Association in 1884.

Skinner served as a right fielder for the Baltimore Monumentals in one game (July 12), then played one game in center field for the Chicago Browns four days later.  In his short career, he collected two hits in six at bats for a career batting average of .333, and also scored one run.  In the field he handled two chances, making no errors.

External links
Skinner's major league statistics at Baseball-Reference.com

1856 births
1901 deaths
19th-century baseball players
Baltimore Monumentals players
Chicago Browns/Pittsburgh Stogies players
Major League Baseball outfielders
Major League Baseball center fielders
Major League Baseball right fielders
Baseball players from Chicago
People from Washington, Massachusetts
Baseball players from Massachusetts
Sportspeople from Berkshire County, Massachusetts